Andrija Balić (born 11 August 1997) is a Croatian footballer who plays as a midfielder for the Slovak side MFK Dukla Banská Bystrica in the Fortuna Liga, on loan from FC DAC 1904 Dunajská Streda.

Club career

Early career
Born in Split but living in nearby Dugopolje, Balić started to train football at the local NK Dugopolje, before moving to the Hajduk Split academy in 2007.

Passing through the ranks, he became a youth international, playing for all Croatian selections between U14 and U19.

In the 2013–14 season he formed a potent midfield partnership for the Hajduk U17 team with Nikola Vlašić, which resulted in the team finishing the first half of the season in first place, without a single loss. The two then received and signed professional contracts, until 2017 and were moved to the U19 team. Balić made his first team debut in the 1–0 home win against RNK Split, coming in the 76th minute of the match for Temurkhuja Abdukholiqov.

Hajduk Split
He had to wait until December to make his first appearance of the 2014–15 season, but then became a much more prevalent member of the first team. He got his first start for Hajduk on 18 February 2015, in a 3–0 away loss to Rijeka. He scored his first goal for Hajduk on 1 March 2015 in a 2–2 draw against Zadar, helping his side claw a point after being 2–0 down. His bigger impact on the first team led Balić to be rewarded with a new contract ending in mid-2018.

Udinese
On 1 February 2016, he signed for Udinese in a €4 million deal. In his first half-season with Udinese, Balić made the bench on 15 occasions, but failed to make a first team appearance. The next season was much the same for Balić, sitting on the bench 28 times without making an appearance before making his senior team debut on 7 May 2017 in a 1–1 draw with Atalanta Bergamo at the Stadio Friuli, playing the first 60 minutes before being replaced by Sven Kums. He would go on to appear in the three following matches and score his first goal for Udinese in a 5–2 loss to Inter Milan at the San Siro. Balić made just one appearance in the first 11 rounds of the 2017–18 Serie A season,  but following the appointment of Massimo Oddo, he became more prevalent in the first eleven once more.

Fortuna Sittard (loan)
On 24 January 2019, Balić joined to Dutch club Fortuna Sittard on loan until 30 June 2019.

Perugia (loan)
On 30 August 2019, he joined Serie B club Perugia on a season-long loan.

DAC Dunajská Streda
Balić continued to be loaned out of Udinese, as his next half-season loan was announced on 14 February 2020, when he was loaned out to DAC 1904 Dunajská Streda, playing in the Slovak Fortuna Liga.

Balić made his Fortuna Liga debut in an away fixture against Ružomberok on 22 February 2020. Balić was fielded in the starting line-up but was replaced before the second half by Eric Ramírez. The match concluded in a goal-less tie.

Balić scored his first and only league goal for DAC in his first game after the COVID-19 pandemic. On 21 June 2020, DAC defeated Spartak Trnava (2:0) at Štadión Antona Malatinského. Balić completed the entire match scored the second goal of the match, following a pass from Marko Divković. Earlier on, on 4 March, Balić scored in a 2:0 win over Poprad in the quarterfinals of the Slovnaft Cup, scoring the second goal of the match. He also appeared in a crucial 0:3 defeat against Ružomberok in the away tie of the semifinals, ending DAC's campaign in the Cup.

Of 12 eligible games in the 2019/20 season, he participated in nine matches, scoring two goals. After the conclusion of the season, he moved to DAC on a permanent transfer, signing a three-season deal.

Career statistics

References

External links

Andrija Balić at hajduk.hr

1997 births
Living people
Footballers from Split, Croatia
Association football midfielders
Croatian footballers
Croatia youth international footballers
Croatia under-21 international footballers
HNK Hajduk Split players
Udinese Calcio players
Fortuna Sittard players
A.C. Perugia Calcio players
FC DAC 1904 Dunajská Streda players
MFK Dukla Banská Bystrica players
Croatian Football League players
Serie A players
Eredivisie players
Slovak Super Liga players
Croatian expatriate footballers
Expatriate footballers in Italy
Expatriate footballers in the Netherlands
Expatriate footballers in Slovakia
Croatian expatriate sportspeople in Italy
Croatian expatriate sportspeople in the Netherlands
Croatian expatriate sportspeople in Slovakia